Paratricharia is a genus of fungi within the Gomphillaceae family. It is a monotypic genus, containing the single species Paratricharia paradoxa.

References

Ostropales
Lichen genera
Ostropales genera